Essential is a compilation album by the American artist CeCe Peniston, released on March 13, 2000.

Track listing

Credits and personnel

References

General

Specific

External links
 

CeCe Peniston compilation albums
2000 greatest hits albums
A&M Records compilation albums
Universal Music Group compilation albums